Pervin is a given name. From the original Persian "Parvin". Notable people with the name include:

 Pervin Buldan, Kurdish politician
 Nasreen Pervin Huq, Bangladeshi women's activist
 Pervin Özdemir, Turkish ceramics artist
 Pervin Shroff, Indian scientist

Turkish feminine given names